La Niña Buena is the second album by the Mexican singer Mariana Seoane, released in 2005.

Track listing
 Una De Dos	
 Como Tú Sabes	
 No Vuelvo Contigo
 Bendito Favor	
 La Luna Y Tú
 No Es Normal
 Lucas, Lucas
 Dime Que Me Necesitas
 Al Amor De Tu Vida	
 ¿Qué Nos Pasó?

References

Mariana Seoane albums
2005 albums